The 2020–21 season of the Belgian First Division B began in August 2020 and ended in April 2021. Union SG became champions on 13 March 2021, returning to the highest level of Belgian football for the first time since the 1972–73 season.

Team changes

In
 Deinze were promoted from the 2019–20 Belgian First Amateur Division as champions.
 Seraing and RWD Molenbeek filled in the open spots left by the extra relegations of Roeselare and Virton, as highest finishing teams which had obtained a professional footballing license.
 As a result of the COVID-19 pandemic in Belgium, no team was relegated from the 2019–20 Belgian First Division A and two teams were promoted from the 2019–20 Belgian First Division B, meaning two extra teams needed to be added to the league. From the 2019–20 Belgian First Amateur Division only Lierse Kempenzonen remained as team which had obtained the necessary Belgian professional football license (despite nearly relegating in that division), hence they were promoted and finally as no other team was eligible from that division, the youth squad of Club Brugge was added to again end up with 8 teams. This team will play under the name Club NXT.

Out
 Due to the Belgian First Division A expanding from 16 to 18 teams, both finalists Beerschot and OH Leuven were promoted to Belgian First Division A for the next season.
 Lokeren went bankrupt and folded. Temse moved to Lokeren and renamed themselves K.S.C. Lokeren-Temse playing in the Belgian Second Amateur Division.
 Both Roeselare and Virton were denied a professional license and forced to relegate, Roeselare to the Belgian First Amateur Division, Virton to the Belgian Second Amateur Division as they were also refused a remunerated license.

Format changes
Only in the 2020–21 season, the league will no longer consist of two separate competitions but will be one single league in which all teams play each other four times. There will be no more playoffs, no teams will qualify for the Europa League playoffs and the bottom team will be relegated directly.

Team information

Stadiums and locations

Personnel and kits

Managerial changes

League table

Season statistics

Top scorers

Top assists

Clean sheets

Team of the season
Upon completion of the regular season a team of the season award was compiled, based upon the results of the team of the week results throughout the season, constructed based on nominations from managers, assistant-managers, journalists and analysts. The results were announced from 4 May 2021, with one player revealed each day.

Number of teams by provinces 
While Club NXT is a team from West Flanders, they are playing their home matches in Lokeren, which is located in East Flanders.

References

2020-21
2020–21 in European second tier association football leagues
2